Vinny Mukendi (born 12 March 1992) is an English-born Congolese footballer who plays as a striker for AFC Mansfield. He has previously played for twenty clubs including Macclesfield Town, Barrow, Droylsden, Stalybridge Celtic, Salford City, Southport, Oxford City, North Ferriby United, Nantwich Town and Redditch United, in addition to loan spells at Southport and Tamworth.

Club career

Macclesfield Town
Born in Manchester, Greater Manchester, Mukendi started at Macclesfield Town in 2008, joining their youth academy on a two-year scholarship. He impressed enough to be given a squad number while still 16 and made his league debut on the final day of the 2008–09 season in a 0–0 draw against Grimsby Town. His first goal for the club came on 16 April 2010 when his team beat Chesterfield.

Southport (loans)
Mukendi joined Conference National side Southport on a one-month loan deal on 23 September 2011. He made his debut for the club a day later, coming on as a 68th-minute substitute in a 4–0 home defeat against Braintree Town.

Mukendi's first goal on loan at Southport was a second half equaliser in a 1–1 draw at home to York City on 11 October 2011. He subsequently received a yellow card for his celebration.

Mukendi was recalled to Macclesfield on 26 October 2011 following a selection crisis among the club's strikers. He re-joined Southport again on 19 January 2012 for an initial month's loan but was again recalled when Macclesfield suffered another selection problem. In May 2012, Mukendi was released by Macclesfield due to the expiry of his contract.

Barrow
On 10 August 2012, Mukendi signed for Barrow. He made his debut for the club in the 0–0 draw with AFC Telford United the following day and went on to make four appearances for the Cumbrian side, three of them as a substitute. On 11 September 2012, Mukendi was released from his contract for personal reasons.

Tamworth (loan)
After less than a month with Barrow, Mukendi joined Conference National rivals Tamworth on 31 August 2012 on a one-month loan deal. He made one appearance for Tamworth before his loan was cancelled when he was released by Barrow on 11 September 2012.

Droylsden
He signed for Droylsden on 14 September although the club stated that he signed forms but on advice from FA could only play for them from 28 September onwards. The following day he made his club debut in a match against Gloucester City.

Stalybridge Celtic
He then joined Stalybridge Celtic in October 2012 and made three appearances before leaving the club in November 2012.

Salford
His next move in 2013 was to Salford City.

Goole
He briefly signed then for Goole in November 2013, making four league appearances for the club in November and December, scoring once for the club.

Southport
In February 2014 he re-joined Southport, this time on a permanent deal.

Colwyn Bay
In the summer of 2014 he moved to Colwyn Bay on trial. He played three games before leaving the club.

Nantwich Town
He then moved to Nantwich Town in August 2014.

Connah's Quay
He then briefly signed for Welsh Premier League club Gap Connah's Quay, but left without making a league appearance.

Radcliffe Borough
In February 2015 he joined Radcliffe Borough.

Ramsbottom United
The following month he signed for Ramsbottom United, scoring on his debut for the club. He made seven appearances for the club between March and April.

Oxford City
Following on from this, after scoring as a trialist in July 2015 he joined Oxford City. He made his competitive debut for the club in a 0–6 away win against Truro City, scoring a second-half hat-trick.

North Ferriby United
In July 2016 he joined North Ferriby United. He left the club in December.

Hednesford Town
In December 2016 he joined Hednesford Town. He made his debut for the club on Boxing Day but was substituted after 22 minutes after breaking his nose. He left the club in March 2017. He played ten games for the club, scoring four goals.

Nantwich Town (second spell)
He then re-joined Nantwich Town for a second spell.

Redditch United
In the summer of 2017 he was on trial at Torquay United but did not earn a contract
before joining Redditch United.
After an impressive start of two goals in his first four games, Mukendi picked up an injury on 26 August against Dorchester Town, and subsequently missed games against Stratford Town and Lincoln United. In November he was ruled out due to an injury for the rest of the season.

Atherton LR
In September 2020 he joined North West Counties League club Atherton LR

Sheffield
In December 2021 he joined Sheffield, having last played for Pennington.

AFC Mansfield
In September 2022, Mukendi signed for AFC Mansfield.

International career
Mukendi was called up for the Democratic Republic of the Congo under-19 squad in March 2011, being capped for the national team before being ruled out by injury in the Reze tournament.

Personal life
His younger brother, Henoc, is also a footballer.

References

External links

Port Online Player Profile

1992 births
Living people
Footballers from Manchester
English footballers
Democratic Republic of the Congo footballers
Democratic Republic of the Congo youth international footballers
Association football forwards
Macclesfield Town F.C. players
Southport F.C. players
Barrow A.F.C. players
Tamworth F.C. players
Droylsden F.C. players
Stalybridge Celtic F.C. players
Goole A.F.C. players
Salford City F.C. players
Nantwich Town F.C. players
Colwyn Bay F.C. players
Connah's Quay Nomads F.C. players
Oxford City F.C. players
North Ferriby United A.F.C. players
English Football League players
National League (English football) players
Northern Premier League players
Hednesford Town F.C. players
Redditch United F.C. players
Ramsbottom United F.C. players
Radcliffe F.C. players